Moniz is a surname in the Portuguese language, namely in Portugal and Brazil. It is believed to derive from a Gothic, or Gascon given names Munnius, Monio, Munino, Monnio, and Munnio used in the Iberian Peninsula in the Middle Ages. 
It is uncertain whether the Galician and Asturian 'Muñiz' or 'Muniz' surnames are in any way related with Moniz. The Portuguese variants of the medieval name were Munio, Monio and Moninho, making Moniz (son of Moninho or Munio) a patronymic surname. It may refer to:

António Egas Moniz (1874-1955), Portuguese physician, neurologist and Nobel Prize laureate
Bryant Moniz, quarterback for the University of Hawaii Warriors football team
Charlie Moniz (born 1980), Canadian musician
Diogo Gil Moniz, Portuguese nobleman, son of Gil Aires Moniz
Ernest Moniz (born 1944), American physicist and U.S. Secretary of Energy (2013–2017)
Febo Moniz (1515-aft. 1580), Portuguese nobleman
Febo Moniz de Lusignan, Portuguese nobleman, grandfather of Febo Moniz
Felipa Perestrello Moniz, Portuguese wife of Christopher Columbus
Frank Moniz (1911-2004), American soccer player
Gil Aires Moniz, Portuguese nobleman
Júlio Botelho Moniz (1900-1970), Portuguese soldier and politician
Lúcia Moniz (born 1976), Portuguese singer and actress
Martim Moniz (died 1147), Portuguese knight noted for his role in the Siege of Lisbon
Matt Moniz, an American high-altitude mountaineer and public speaker
Michael Moniz, an American business executive and high-altitude mountaineer
Pedro Moniz da Silva, Portuguese nobleman, son of Diogo Gil Moniz
Ricardo Moniz (born 1964), Dutch former footballer and coach
Rui Gil Moniz, Portuguese nobleman, son of Gil Aires Moniz
Vasco Gil Moniz (died 1497), Portuguese nobleman, son of Gil Aires Moniz
Wendy Moniz (born 1969), American actress

See also
Moniz sign, a medical sign

References

Portuguese-language surnames
Patronymic surnames